Tony A. Garofano was an American politician and barber who served in the Massachusetts House of Representatives in 1920 and from 1923 to 1935. After leaving the legislature, he served as the chairman of the Board of Registration of Barbers and was an employee in the State Department of Public Works. Garofano was also an incorporator of the Saugus Trust Company, a Saugus, Massachusetts-based Trust company that existed from 1928 until it was purchased by Eastern Bank in 1994.

See also
 1920 Massachusetts legislature
 1923–1924 Massachusetts legislature
 1925–1926 Massachusetts legislature
 1927–1928 Massachusetts legislature
 1929–1930 Massachusetts legislature
 1931–1932 Massachusetts legislature
 1933–1934 Massachusetts legislature

References

Democratic Party members of the Massachusetts House of Representatives
Politicians from Lynn, Massachusetts
People from Saugus, Massachusetts
1885 births
1946 deaths
20th-century American politicians
Italian emigrants to the United States